Shosse Entuziastov may refer to:

 Shosse Entuziastov (Kalininsko-Solntsevskaya Line), a Moscow Metro station, Russia
 Shosse Entuziastov (Moscow Central Circle), a Moscow Metro station, Russia
 Entuziastov Highway, after which Shosse Entuziastov (Kalininsko-Solntsevskaya Line) is named.